Hartsuiker is a surname. Notable people with the surname include:

Erik Hartsuiker (born 1940), Dutch rower
Ton Hartsuiker (1933–2015), Dutch classical pianist and composer